Marc Walter Rzepczynski (born August 29, 1985), nicknamed Scrabble, is an American professional baseball pitcher for the Lancaster Barnstormers of the Atlantic League of Professional Baseball. He has played in Major League Baseball (MLB) for the Toronto Blue Jays, St. Louis Cardinals, Cleveland Indians, San Diego Padres, Oakland Athletics, Washington Nationals, and Seattle Mariners.

Amateur career
Rzepczynski attended Servite High School in Anaheim, California and the University of California, Riverside, where he played college baseball for the Highlanders from 2004–2007. In his senior season, the Highlanders won the Big West Conference championship and appeared in the NCAA Tournament.

He also played for the Corvallis Knights and the Bellingham Bells (2004) in the West Coast League, an independent summer collegiate league.

Professional career

Toronto Blue Jays
In June 2007, Rzepczynski was drafted in the fifth round (175th overall) of the 2007 Major League Baseball draft by the Toronto Blue Jays. He made his professional debut that season for the short-season Jays' Class A affiliate Auburn Doubledays of the New York–Penn League. With Auburn, he posted a 5–0 record and a 2.76 ERA in 11 games (7 starts), with 49 strikeouts and 17 walks in  innings pitched.

In 2008, Rzepczynski advanced to the Class A Lansing Lugnuts of the Midwest League, where he finished 7–6 with a 2.83 ERA in 22 starts, with 124 strikeouts and 42 walks over 121 innings pitched.

In 2009, Rzepczynski through early July had split his season between the New Hampshire Fisher Cats, the Jays' Double-A team in the Eastern League, and the Las Vegas 51s, the Jays' Triple-A team in the Pacific Coast League. His 2009 statistics between Double-A and Triple-A combined for 16 games (all starts), with a 9–5 record, a 2.66 ERA, 104 strikeouts, and 40 walks, in 88 innings pitched.

A series of injuries to pitchers at the major league level had plagued the parent Blue Jays for the first three months of the 2009 season, leading to opportunities for several rookies to advance to the top level. Scott Richmond, himself a rookie starter who had pitched very well for Toronto, became the latest casualty, when he went on the disabled list on July 4, retroactive to July 1, due to biceps tendinitis. Richmond, before play on July 6, ranked 16th of 40 eligible American League pitchers in Earned Run Average (ERA). Brett Cecil, another rookie who was already in the Jays' starting rotation, started on July 5 on short notice in Richmond's stead, against the New York Yankees, but this still left Toronto with only four healthy starters, leading to Rzepczynski's promotion and opportunity. Rzepczynski pitched six innings in his debut, during which he gave up 2 hits and 1 earned run, walked 4, and struck out 7 in a no-decision; the Jays lost, 3–1, in 11 innings. In his second big-league start, Rzepczynski again pitched well, but took the loss against the Baltimore Orioles on July 12, lasting 6 innings and allowing 3 earned runs; Toronto lost the game, 4–2. Rzepczynski won his first major-league game on July 18, defeating the American League leading Boston Red Sox; he pitched 6 innings, allowing 1 earned run on 4 hits, walking 4 and striking out 4; Toronto won, 6–2. Jays manager Cito Gaston stated before the game that Rzepczynski would remain in the rotation for at least the next couple of weeks, pending Richmond's return from the disabled list.

St. Louis Cardinals

He was traded on July 27, 2011, to the St. Louis Cardinals along with Octavio Dotel, Edwin Jackson and Corey Patterson for Colby Rasmus, P. J. Walters, Trever Miller and Brian Tallet. The Cardinals won the 2011 World Series; in the series, Rzepczynski faced a total of four batters in two games, striking out three and giving up a two-run double.

In 2012, Rzepczynski became a lefty specialist, pitching 46.2 innings despite appearing in 70 games for the Cardinals.

On April 29, 2013, Rzepczynski was optioned to the Memphis Redbirds. On July 25, 2013, Rzepczynski was recalled by the St. Louis Cardinals

Cleveland Indians
On July 30, 2013, Rzepczynski was traded to the Cleveland Indians for minor league second baseman Juan Herrera.

San Diego Padres
On July 31, 2015, Rzepczynski was traded to the San Diego Padres for Abraham Almonte.

Oakland Athletics
On December 2, 2015, the Padres traded Rzepczynski and Yonder Alonso to the Oakland Athletics for Drew Pomeranz, José Torres, and a player to be named later or cash considerations.

Washington Nationals
On August 25, 2016, the Athletics traded Rzepczynski to the Washington Nationals for Max Schrock. On October 13, 2016, in the decisive game in the National League Division Series against the Los Angeles Dodgers, Rzepczynski was brought in to relieve Nationals pitcher Max Scherzer with the score tied 1-1. Rzepczynski walked the first batter he faced on four pitches, and became the losing pitcher in the 4-3 loss that eliminated the Nationals from the 2016 playoffs.

Seattle Mariners
On December 3, 2016, the Seattle Mariners signed Rzepczynski to a two-year contract worth $11 million. In his first season as a Mariner, he appeared in 64 games despite pitching a career low 31.1 innings. He was designated for assignment on June 1, 2018 after posting an ERA of 9.39 in 18 games. He was later released on June 6.

Cleveland Indians (second stint)
Rzepczynski signed a minor league contract with the Cleveland Indians on June 18, 2018. On July 11, Rzepczynski was designated for assignment. After clearing waivers, Rzepczynski elected free agency.

Seattle Mariners (second stint)
On July 30, 2018, Rzepczynski signed a minor league deal with the Seattle Mariners. He elected free agency on November 2, 2018.

Arizona Diamondbacks
On February 8, 2019, Rzepczynski signed a minor league deal with the Arizona Diamondbacks that included an invitation to spring training. He was released on May 31, but later re-signed to another minor league deal on June 24. He was released on August 25.

Toronto Blue Jays (second stint)
On February 24, 2020, Rzepczynski signed a minor league contract with the Toronto Blue Jays. Rzepczynski did not play in a game in 2020 due to the cancellation of the minor league season because of the COVID-19 pandemic. He was released by Toronto on July 27.

In May 2021, Rzepczynski was named to the roster of the United States national baseball team for the Americas Qualifying Event.

Lancaster Barnstormers
On March 16, 2022, Rzepczynski signed with the Lancaster Barnstormers of the Atlantic League of Professional Baseball. He made 7 appearances for the Barnstormers, posting a 2.84 ERA with 6 strikeouts in 6.1 innings pitched. With Lancaster, he won the 2022 Atlantic League championship.

Personal life
Rzepczynski is of Polish descent.  Rzepczynski's nickname is "Scrabble".

Rzepczynski is married to Lindzey Lawler of Cleveland, Ohio.  They resided in Ladera Ranch, California, but sold the home in 2019.

References

External links

1985 births
Living people
People from Oak Lawn, Illinois
Baseball players from Illinois
Baseball players from California
American people of Polish descent
Servite High School alumni
Major League Baseball pitchers
American expatriate baseball players in Canada
Toronto Blue Jays players
St. Louis Cardinals players
Cleveland Indians players
San Diego Padres players
Oakland Athletics players
Washington Nationals players
Seattle Mariners players
UC Riverside Highlanders baseball players
Auburn Doubledays players
Lansing Lugnuts players
New Hampshire Fisher Cats players
Las Vegas 51s players
Peoria Javelinas players
Memphis Redbirds players
Columbus Clippers players
Tacoma Rainiers players
Reno Aces players
Lancaster Barnstormers players
Mat-Su Miners players
Peninsula Oilers players